Edward Talley may refer to:
 Edward Talley (priest), Welsh Anglican priest
 Edward R. Talley, U.S. Army soldier and Medal of Honor recipient